Katsushi (written: 克志, 克史, 勝志, 豪氏 or かつし in hiragana) is a masculine Japanese given name. Notable people with the name include:

, Japanese animator
, Japanese footballer
, Japanese footballer
, Japanese editor
, Japanese anime director
, Japanese professional wrestler
, Japanese ski jumper

Japanese masculine given names